InterContinental Kaohsiung (Chinese：高雄洲際酒店) is a five star hotel located in Cianjhen District, Kaohsiung, Taiwan. The hotel opened on November 21, 2021, and is the first InterContinental hotel in the country.

Location
The hotel is located at the heart of Kaohsiung's Asia New Bay Area, near Kaohsiung International Airport, Kaohsiung Main Station and Kaohsiung Exhibition Center. Part of the Farglory THE ONE complex, the hotel commences from the 1st to the 16th floor of the second tallest skyscraper in Kaohsiung, and fourth tallest in Taiwan.

Facilities
InterContinental Kaohsiung is operated by InterContinental and offers a total of 253 guest rooms and suites. The hotel features two restaurants - Zhan Liu and SEEDS, a bar - BL.T33 and a bakery - Delicatesse.

See also
 List of tallest buildings in the world
 Farglory THE ONE
 Hotel Nikko Kaohsiung

References

External links
Official website

2021 establishments in Taiwan
Skyscraper hotels in Kaohsiung
Hotels established in 2021
Hotel buildings completed in 2021